Egon Müller (born 26 November 1948 in Kiel, Germany)  is a former international motorcycle speedway rider and was winner of the Speedway World Championship in 1983, winning the title in his homeland with a maximum score of 15 points.

Career

Motorcycle speedway
Egon Müller won the German Champion eight times (1973, 1975, 1977, 1979, 1981, 1983, 1984 and 1985). He rode briefly in the United Kingdom in 1973 for the Coatbridge Tigers (Scotland), and in 1976 for the Hull Vikings. Despite him only appearing for a handful of meetings in 1976, Hull were granted a 'Egon Muller (Rider Replacement)' facility for the entire 1977 season.

Müller won the Long Track World Championship in 1974, 1975 and 1978. He finished second in 1980 and 1984, and finished third in 1976 and 1982. He also represented West Germany in the Speedway World Pairs Championship, finishing a best of 3rd in 1977 at Hyde Road in Manchester, England paired with Hans Wassermann. Müller also competed in the Speedway World Team Cup where he led the West Germans to a third-place finish in both 1981 at the Speedway Stadion in Olching, and again in 1982 at the White City Stadium in London, England. He was also a four-time winner of the Continental Final which was the last World Final qualifying round for European-based riders. Müller won the Continental Final in 1976, 1981, 1984 and 1985.

As of the 2015 Speedway Grand Prix series, Egon Müller is the only German rider to have won the Speedway World Championship when he took out the title with a 15-point maximum at the Motodrom Halbemond in Norden in 1983 from Australian Billy Sanders and 1980 champion Michael Lee. At a time when the Speedway World Championship Final was a single meeting that could throw up a surprise winner on the day, Müller was generally seen as a 'one hit wonder' in the same way that Poland's 1973 World Champion Jerzy Szczakiel was. However, Müller was a perennial championship contender having made four previous World Final appearances (1976, 1977, 1980 and 1981) as well as being a triple Long track World Champion, and an 8 time German Champion.

Following the 1983 World Final, rumours surfaced that West German officials had given Müller extra practice time on the  Norden track that the other riders were not given. Other rumours also surfaced that many of the riders believed that the track had been prepared more like a long track in order to give Müller an advantage, with the track actually receiving a grade by the tractor after each race. In commentary for British television, 1976 World Champion Peter Collins noted that the Motodrom that day was more like a Grass track than a regular speedway which definitely suited the West German.

Just two weeks after his 1983 World Championship win, Müller was reportedly involved in a motor accident on the Autobahn where he wrote off his Porsche. The accident saw him spend a couple of days in hospital with minor leg injuries. Just one week following this, he competed in the 1983 World Long Track final in Czechoslovakia.

Müller went on to ride in the 1984 and 1985 World Finals but could not replicate his 1983 win, finishing in 14th place with just 3 points from his five rides on each occasion.

Music/actor
Outside of his sport career, Muller was a pop singer under the stage name Amadeus Liszt (with some hits like "La Donna" in 1986, "Win The Race" in 1987 and "The Devil Wins" in 1989),  a moderator at trade fairs, shows and charity events, an actor and a television personality.

World Final appearances

Individual World Championship
 1976 -  Chorzów, Silesian Stadium - 8th - 8pts
 1977 -  Gothenburg, Ullevi - 7th - 8pts 
 1980 -  Gothenburg, Ullevi - 14th - 4pts
 1981 -  London, Wembley Stadium - 7th - 9pts 
 1983 -  Norden, Motodrom Halbemond - Winner - 15pts
 1984 -  Gothenburg, Ullevi - 14th - 3pts 
 1985 -  Bradford, Odsal Stadium - 12th - 5pts

World Pairs Championship
 1977 -  Manchester, Hyde Road (with Hans Wassermann) - 3rd - 18pts (11)
 1981 -  Chorzów, Silesian Stadium (with Georg Gilgenreiner) - 7th - 3pts (2)
 1983 -  Gothenburg, Ullevi (with Karl Maier) - 6th - 12pts (6)

World Team Cup
 1981 -  Olching, Speedway Stadion Olching (with Karl Maier / Georg Hack / Georg Gilgenreiner) - 3rd - 28pts (10)
 1982 -  London, White City Stadium (with Georg Hack / Karl Maier / Alois Wiesböck / Georg Gilgenreiner) - 3rd - 18pts (5)

World Longtrack Championship

 1973 -  Oslo (9th) 10pts
 1974 -  Scheeßel (Champion) 30pts
 1975 -  Gornja Radgona (Champion) 27pts
 1976 -  Marianske Lazne (Third) 21pts
 1977 -  Aalborg (18th) 0pts
 1978 -  Mühldorf (Champion) 26pts
 1979 -  Marianske Lazne (7th) 12pts
 1980 -  Scheeßel (Second) 18pts
 1981 -  Gornja Radgona (5th) 16pts
 1982 -  Esbjerg (Third) 21pts
 1983 -  Marianske Lazne (8th) 11pts
 1984 -  Herxheim (Second) 19 pts
 1985 -  Esbjerg (5th) 17pts
 1986 Semi-final
 1987 -  Mühldorf (5th) 15pts
 1988 -  Scheeßel (9th) 15pts
 1989 -  Marianske Lazne (5th) 22pts
 1990 Semi-final
 1991 Semi-final
 1992 -  Pfarrkirchen (11th) 6pts
 1993 -  Mühldorf (7th) 11
 1994 -  Marianske Lazne (4th) 17pts
 1995 Semi-final
 1996 -  Herxheim (13th) 5pts

Grand-Prix

 1997 5 app (6th) 66pts

Best Grand-Prix Results

  -  Cloppenberg Third 1997
  -  Pfarrkirchen Second 1997

West German Longtrack Champion
1973, 1975, 1977, 1982, 1984, 1985.

European Grasstrack Championship

 1975 -  Joure (Non-starter)
 1976 - Preliminary Round

References

External links
 http://grasstrackgb.co.uk/egon-muller/

1948 births
Living people
German speedway riders
Individual Speedway World Champions
Hull Vikings riders
Sportspeople from Kiel